Alex Golesh (born June 24, 1984) is an American football coach who is currently the head football coach at the University of South Florida. He was previously the offensive coordinator and tight ends coach at the University of Tennessee.

Coaching career 
Golesh began his coaching career as an assistant coach working with the defensive line at Westerville Central High School in Ohio, whose football program was in its first year. He was later hired as a student assistant at Ohio State in 2004 where he earned his degree in 2006. He also spent time coaching at Northern Illinois and Oklahoma State as a graduate assistant.

Toledo 
Golesh was hired as the running backs coach and recruiting coordinator at Toledo in 2009 working under Tim Beckman, who he also worked under at Oklahoma State as a defensive graduate assistant. He was later shifted to the tight ends coach in 2010. Golesh aided the Toledo program in securing the No. 1 recruiting class in the Mid-American Conference in consecutive years.

Illinois 
Golesh followed Beckman to Illinois in 2012, working once again as the tight ends coach and recruiting coordinator. He also added running backs coach duties in 2014 and was later promoted to special teams coordinator in 2015.

Iowa State 
Golesh was hired as the tight ends coach and recruiting coordinator at Iowa State in 2016 under Matt Campbell, who he worked with at Toledo. In the season before Golesh came to Ames, Iowa State tight ends caught a combined five passes. In 2019, Cyclone tight ends caught 75 passes under his direction and played a pivotal role in the team’s success. Golesh mentored all-conference performers at tight end in 2017, 2018 and 2019, as the Cyclones recorded a pair of 8-5 seasons and back-to-back bowl berths in 2017 and 2018. In 2018, Iowa State broke its school record for conference victories in a season (six), tying for third in the Big 12 for the best conference finish 40 years. In 2019, the Cyclones ended 7-6 after an appearance in the Camping World Bowl in Orlando, for their third consecutive bowl invitation. 

Sophomore tight end starter Charlie Kolar caught 51 passes for 697 yards (most yards all-time by a Cyclone tight end in a season) and seven touchdowns, helping him earn second-team All-America honors from Pro Football Focus and first-team All-Big 12 recognition, as well as first-team Academic All-America notice. He also was a semifinalist for the Mackey Award as one of the nation’s top tight ends. Teammate Chase Allen earned second-team All-Big 12 honors as Golesh’s unit completed the rare feat of sweeping both All-Big 12 tight end awards. The tight production helped Iowa State rank 11th nationally and second in the Big 12 in passing offense at 311.3 yards per game. Both, Charlie Kolar and Chase Allen, participated in the 2022 NFL Combine.

UCF 
Golesh was hired as a co-offensive coordinator and tight ends coach at UCF in 2020, working under Josh Heupel. Despite the challenges presented by the unique COVID-19 shortened season, the  Knights shined offensively in Golesh’s first year, ranking second in the FBS in total offense (568.1), fourth in passing offense (357.4), seventh in total passing yards (3,574) and eighth nationally in scoring offense (42.2).

Tennessee 
Golesh followed Heupel to Tennessee as offensive coordinator and tight ends coach in 2021. During the 2021 season, Golesh helped Tennessee shatter eight team single-season records, including points (511), total offensive yards (6,174), touchdowns (67), point after touchdowns made (67), total first downs (316), rushing first downs (164), fewest interceptions thrown (3) and passing efficiency (167.10). Tennessee improved their scoring offense by 101 spots, going from 108th in the country in 2020 to seventh in 2021.

South Florida 
On December 4, 2022, Golesh was announced as the sixth head coach of South Florida.

Personal life 
Born in Moscow, Golesh moved to the United States as a child, growing up in Brooklyn, New York and Dublin, Ohio. Golesh and his wife Alexis have a daughter and a son, Corbin and Barrett.

Head coaching record

References

External links
 
 Iowa State profile
 Tennessee profile

1984 births
Living people
Illinois Fighting Illini football coaches
Iowa State Cyclones football coaches
Northern Illinois Huskies football coaches
Ohio State Buckeyes football coaches
Oklahoma State Cowboys football coaches
High school football coaches in Ohio
Toledo Rockets football coaches
UCF Knights football coaches
Tennessee Volunteers football coaches
Ohio State University alumni
People from Brooklyn, Ohio
People from Dublin, Ohio
Sportspeople from Moscow
Coaches of American football from Ohio
Soviet emigrants to the United States
Russian emigrants to the United States